Haggai is one of the Biblical minor prophets.

Haggai or Hagai may also refer to:

 Book of Haggai, the book of the Bible attributed to the prophet Haggai
 Haggai, Missouri, ghost town, United States
 Beit Hagai, officially just Hagai, a religious Israeli settlement in the West Bank
 Hagai Levi, Israeli film and television director
 Hagai Shaham, Israeli violinist
 Hagai Zamir, Israeli paralympic champion